Roger Walker may refer to:

Roger Walker (actor) (born 1944), British actor
Roger Walker (architect) (born 1942), New Zealand architect
Roger Walker (footballer) (born 1966), English former professional footballer
Roger Walker (rugby union) (1846–1919), English international rugby player and Lancashire cricketer
Roger G. Walker, Canadian geologist